Lyburn is an unincorporated mining community in Logan County, West Virginia, United States. Lyburn is also the home of the Bearwallow trailhead for the Hatfield-Mccoy ATV trail.

Mining accident
In 2002, a slurry pond break in the head of a hollow past Lyburn Post Office Road flooded more than ten residences. The pond, called "Pond 8A" is part of the Tower Mountain Surface Mine, which is operated by Bandmill Coal Corporation, a subsidiary of Massey Energy. The mine was originally permitted by Elkay Mining Company, a Pittston subsidiary, but was recently taken over by Bandmill. There are more than ten ponds on the mine site.

References

Unincorporated communities in Logan County, West Virginia
Unincorporated communities in West Virginia
Coal towns in West Virginia
Populated places on the Guyandotte River